KFFX (104.9 FM) is a radio station broadcasting an adult contemporary music format, broadcasting as "Mix 104.9 FM". The station is located in Emporia, Kansas, where it is also licensed. KFFX is owned by Emporia's Radio Stations, Inc.

History

KFFX signed on the air in June 1966 as the FM companion to KVOE (AM). Until the early 1970s KVOE-FM would simulcast most of its programming with the AM. In the 1970s it began playing some country music and then, around 1975, split altogether from the AM becoming KLRF (Colorful 105). Following a change in licensee in late 1984 to Emporia Broadcasting, the station shifted to a CHR (Contemporary Hit Radio) format and became KFFX (Fox 105). In January 1986 Valu Broadcasting acquired both the AM and FM stations. In 1994 Valu Broadcasting changed its name to Emporia's Radio Stations, Inc. KFFX shifted to a Hot AC format around 2001 becoming Mix 104.9 and has retained that format since.

Mix 104.9 is home to the Emporia State University Hornets athletic teams. The station uses the slogan Voice of the Hornets during the sports seasons. Greg Rahe, KVOE Sports Director, broadcasts the games, alongside a co-worker. For football, it is Greg Rahe and Chuck Samples, and for basketball it is Greg Rahe and Steve Sauder, owner of Emporia Radio Stations, Inc.

References

External links

FFX
Radio stations established in 1966